Latta House is a historic house in Dyersburg, Tennessee. The house was built in 1852 by Samuel Rankin Latta. Latta was a Pennsylvania native who had moved to Tennessee and worked as a lawyer and teacher. He served as an officer in the Confederate States Army during the Civil War. His Civil War letters to his wife, Mary, are in the Tennessee State Library and Archives. The letters include a first-hand account of the Battle of Shiloh.

The house was listed on the National Register of Historic Places in 1978.

References

Houses on the National Register of Historic Places in Tennessee
Houses completed in 1852
Houses in Dyer County, Tennessee
National Register of Historic Places in Dyer County, Tennessee
1852 establishments in Tennessee